The Natranaerobiales are an order of bacteria placed within the class Clostridia. This order contains the thermophilic bacterial species Natranaerobius thermophilus and the related species Natranaerobaculum magadiense.

See also
 List of bacterial orders
 List of bacteria genera

References